Drug nomenclature is the systematic naming of drugs, especially pharmaceutical drugs. In the majority of circumstances, drugs have 3 types of names: chemical names, the most important of which is the IUPAC name; generic or nonproprietary names, the most important of which are international nonproprietary names (INNs); and trade names, which are brand names. Under the INN system, generic names for drugs are constructed out of affixes and stems that classify the drugs into useful categories while keeping related names distinguishable. A marketed drug might also have a company code or compound code.

Legal regulation
Drug names are often subject to legal regulation, including approval for new drugs (to avoid confusion with existing drugs) and on packaging to establish clear rules about adulterants and fraudulent or misleading labeling. A national formulary is often designated to define drug names (and purity standards) for regulatory purposes. The legally approved names in various countries include:
 Australian Approved Name
 British Approved Name
 Dénomination Commune Française (France)
 Denominazione Comune Italiana (Italy, generic name)
 Japanese Accepted Name
 United States Adopted Name

The World Health Organization administers the international nonproprietary name list.

A company or person developing a drug can apply for a generic (nonproprietary) name through their national formulary or directly to the WHO INN Programme. In order to minimize confusion, many of the national naming bodies have policies of maintaining harmony between national nonproprietary names and INNs. The European Union has mandated this harmonization for all member states  In the United States, the developer applies to United States Adopted Name (USAN) Council, and a USAN negotiator applies to the INN on the developer's behalf.

Chemical names
The chemical names are the scientific names, based on the molecular structure of the drug. There are various systems of chemical nomenclature and thus various chemical names for any one substance. The most important is the IUPAC name. Chemical names are typically very long and too complex to be commonly used in referring to a drug in speech or in prose documents. For example, "1-(isopropylamino)-3-(1-naphthyloxy) propan-2-ol" is a chemical name for propranolol. Sometimes, a company that is developing a drug might give the drug a company code, which is used to identify the drug while it is in development. For example, CDP870 was UCB’s company code for certolizumab pegol; UCB later chose "Cimzia" as its trade name. Many of these codes, although not all, have prefixes that correspond to the company name.

Nonproprietary (generic) names

Generic names are used for a variety of reasons.  They provide a clear and unique identifier for active chemical substances, appearing on all drug labels, advertising, and other information about the substance. Relatedly, they help maintain clear differentiation between proprietary and nonproprietary aspects of reality, which people trying to sell proprietary things have an incentive to obfuscate; they help people compare apples to apples. They are used in scientific descriptions of the chemical, in discussions of the chemical in the scientific literature and descriptions of clinical trials. Generic names usually indicate via their stems what drug class the drug belongs to. For example, one can tell that aciclovir is an antiviral drug because its name ends in the -vir suffix.

History
The earliest roots of standardization of generic names for drugs began with city pharmacopoeias, such as the London, Edinburgh, Dublin, Hamburg, and Berlin Pharmacopoeias. The fundamental advances in chemistry during the 19th century made that era the first time in which what we now call chemical nomenclature, a huge profusion of names based on atoms, functional groups, and molecules, was necessary or conceivable. In the second half of the 19th century and the early 20th, city pharmacopoeias were unified into national pharmacopoeias (such as the British Pharmacopoeia, United States Pharmacopeia, Pharmacopoeia Germanica (PhG or PG), Italian Pharmacopeia, and Japanese Pharmacopoeia) and national formularies (such as the British National Formulary, the Australian Pharmaceutical Formulary, and the National Formulary of India). International pharmacopeias, such as the European Pharmacopoeia and the International Pharmacopoeia of the  World Health Organization (WHO), have been the next level.

In 1953 the WHO created the International Nonproprietary Name (INN) system, which issues INNs in various languages, including Latin, English, French, Spanish, Russian, Chinese, and Arabic. Several countries also have national-level systems for creating generic drug names, including the British Approved Name (BAN) system, the Australian Approved Name (AAN) system, the United States Adopted Name (USAN) system (which is mostly the same as the United States Pharmacopeia (USP) system), and the Japanese Accepted Name (JAN) system. At least several of these national-level Approved Name/Adopted Name/Accepted Name systems were not created until the 1960s, after the INN system already existed. In the 21st century, increasing globalization is encouraging maximal rationalization for new generic names for drugs, and there is an increasing expectation that new USANs, BANs, and JANs will not differ from new INNs without special justification.

During the first half of the 20th century, generic names for drugs were often coined by contracting the chemical names into fewer syllables. Such contraction was partially, informally, locally standardized, but it was not universally consistent. In the second half of the 20th century, the nomenclatural systems moved away from such contraction toward the present system of stems and affixes that show chemical relationships.

Biopharmaceuticals have posed a challenge in nonproprietary naming because unlike smaller molecules made with total synthesis or semisynthesis, there is less assurance of complete fungibility between products from different manufacturers. Just as wine may vary by strain of yeast and year of grape harvest, so each product can be subtly different because living organisms are an integral part of production. The WHO MedNet community continually works to augment its system for biopharmaceuticals to ensure continued fulfillment of the goals served by having nonproprietary names. In recent years the development of the Biological Qualifier system has been an example.

The prefixes and infixes have no pharmacological significance and are used to separate the drug from others in the same class. Suffixes or stems may be found in the middle or more often the end of the drug name, and normally suggest the action of the drug. Generic names often have suffixes that define what class the drug is.

List of stems and affixes

More comprehensive lists can be found at the National Library of Medicine's Drug Information Portal or in Appendix VII of the USP Dictionary.

Example breakdown of a drug name
If the name of the drug solanezumab were to be broken down, it would be divided into two parts like this: solane-zumab. -Zumab is the suffix for humanized monoclonal antibody. Monoclonal antibodies by definition contain only a single antibody clone and have binding specificity for one particular epitope. In the case of solanezumab, the antibody is designed to bond to the amyloid-β peptides which make up protein plaques on the neurons of people with Alzheimer's disease.

See also Time release technology > List of abbreviations for formulation suffixes.

Combination drug products
For combination drug products—those with two or more drugs combined into a single dosage form—single nonproprietary names beginning with "co-" exist in both British Approved Name (BAN) form and in a formerly maintained USP name called the pharmacy equivalent name (PEN). Otherwise the two names are simply both given, joined by hyphens or slashes. For example, suspensions combining trimethoprim and sulfamethoxazole are called either trimethoprim/sulfamethoxazole or co-trimoxazole. Similarly, co-codamol is codeine-paracetamol (acetaminophen), and co-triamterzide is triamterene-hydrochlorothiazide. The USP ceased maintaining PENs, but the similar "co"-prefixed BANs are still current.

Pronunciation
Most commonly, a nonproprietary drug name has one widely agreed pronunciation in each language. For example, doxorubicin is consistently  in English. Trade names almost always have one accepted pronunciation, because the sponsoring company who coined the name has an intended pronunciation for it.

However, it is also common for a nonproprietary drug name to have two pronunciation variants, or sometimes three.

Some of the variation comes from the fact that some stems and affixes have pronunciation variants.

The World Health Organization does not give suggested pronunciations for its INNs, but familiarity with the typical sounds and spellings of the stems and affixes often points to the widely accepted pronunciation of any given INN. For example, abciximab is predictably , because for INNs ending in -ciximab, the  sound is familiar. The United States Pharmacopeia gives suggested pronunciations for most USANs in its USP Dictionary, which is published in annual editions. Medical dictionaries give pronunciations of many drugs that are both commonly used and have been commercially available for a decade or more, although many newer drugs or less common drugs are not entered. Pharmacists also have access to pronunciations from various clinical decision support systems such as Lexi-comp.

Drug brands
For drugs that make it all the way through development, testing, and regulatory acceptance, the pharmaceutical company then gives the drug a trade name, which is a standard term in the pharmaceutical industry for a brand name or trademark name. For example, Lipitor is Pfizer's trade name for atorvastatin, a cholesterol-lowering medication. Many drugs have multiple trade names, reflecting marketing in different countries, manufacture by different companies, or both. Thus the trade names for atorvastatin include not only Lipitor (in the U.S.) but also Atocor (in India).

Publication policies for nonproprietary and proprietary names

In the scientific literature, there is a set of strong conventions for drug nomenclature regarding the letter case and placement of nonproprietary and proprietary names, as follows:
 Nonproprietary names begin in lowercase; trade names begin with a capital.
 Unbiased mentions of a drug place the nonproprietary name first and follow it with the trade name in parentheses, if relevant (for example, "doxorubicin (Adriamycin)").
 This pattern is important for the scientific literature, where conflict of interest is disclosed or avoided. The authors reporting on a study are not endorsing any particular brand of drug. They will often state which brand was used, for methodologic validity (fully disclosing all details that might possibly affect reproducibility), but they do so in a way that makes clear the absence of endorsement.

For example, the 2015 American Society of Hematology (ASH) publication policies say, "Non-proprietary (generic/scientific) names should be used and should be lowercase." ... "[T]he first letter of the name of a proprietary drug should be capitalized." ... "If necessary, you may include a proprietary name in parentheses directly following the generic name after its first mention."

Valid exceptions to the general pattern occur when a nonproprietary name starts a sentence (and thus takes a capital), when a proprietary name has intercapping (for example, GoLYTELY, MiraLAX), or when tall-man letters are used within nonproprietary names to prevent confusion of similar names (for example, predniSONE versus predniSOLONE).

Examples

See also
 Drug class
 Drug development
 Generic brand
 Pharmaceutical code
 Regulation of therapeutic goods
 List of pharmaceutical compound number prefixes

References

Pharmaceutical industry
Pharmaceuticals policy
Pharmacological classification systems